George King (1899 – 26 June 1966) was an English actors' agent, film director, producer and screenplay writer. He is associated with the production of quota quickies. He helmed several of Tod Slaughter's melodramas, including 1936's The Demon Barber of Fleet Street.

Career
King entered into the film industry after completion of medical studies. His first film Too Many Crooks featured a young stage actor named Laurence Olivier, also making his film debut. Once launched from routine thrillers, King made the usual array of lightweight comedies, romances and thrillers. With the outbreak of war, King directed some distinctly up-market war movies, most successful of which was Candlelight in Algeria, a vehicle for James Mason. He was also successful with 1947's The Shop at Sly Corner, which introduced Diana Dors, featuring a charismatic performance by Oscar Homolka and a notable performance by Kenneth Griffith.

Filmography

Director
Forbidden (1949)
The Shop at Sly Corner (1947)
Gaiety George (1946)
Candlelight in Algeria (1944)
Tomorrow We Live (1943)
George and Margaret (1940)
Two for Danger (1940)
The Case of the Frightened Lady (1940)
The Chinese Bungalow (1940)
Crimes at the Dark House (1940)
The Face at the Window (1939)
John Halifax (1938)
Sexton Blake and the Hooded Terror (1938)
Silver Top (1938)
 Wanted! (1937)
 Merry Comes to Town (1937)
The Ticket of Leave Man (1937)
 Under a Cloud (1937)
The Crimes of Stephen Hawke (1936)
Reasonable Doubt (1936)
Sweeney Todd: The Demon Barber of Fleet Street (1936)
Full Circle (1935)
 Gay Old Dog (1935)
 The Man Without a Face (1935)
Windfall (1935)
 Adventure Ltd. (1935)
 The Office Wife (1934)
To Be a Lady (1934)
Guest of Honour (1934)
The Blue Squadron (1934)
Get Your Man (1934)
Little Stranger (1934)
 Murder at the Inn (1934)
 Nine Forty-Five (1934)
 Oh No Doctor! (1934)
The Silver Spoon (1934)
 Smithy (1933)
 Beware of Women (1933)
 Enemy of the Police (1933)
Her Imaginary Lover (1933)
High Finance (1933)
I Adore You (1933)
Matinee Idol (1933)
Mayfair Girl (1933)
To Brighton with Gladys (1933)
Too Many Wives (1933)
 Self Made Lady (1932)
Men of Steel (1932)
 Number, Please (1931)
 The Professional Guest (1931)
Deadlock (1931)
Midnight (1931)
Leave It to Me (1930)
Too Many Crooks (1930)

Producer

"The Gay Cavalier" (1957) TV Series
 Eight O'Clock Walk (1954)
Forbidden (1948)
The Shop at Sly Corner (1947)
Gaiety George (1946)
The First of the Few (1942)
The Chinese Bungalow (1940)
Crimes at the Dark House (1940)
The Face at the Window (1939)
John Halifax (1938)
Sexton Blake and the Hooded Terror (1938)
Silver Top (1938)
Wanted (1937)
 Double Exposures (1937)
The Elder Brother (1937)
 It's Never Too Late to Mend (1937)
Merry Comes to Town (1937)
 Riding High (1937)
Under a Cloud (1937)
The Crimes of Stephen Hawke (1936)
Gay Old Dog (1935)
 Handle with Care (1935)
Lend Me Your Husband (1935)
Maria Marten (1935)
Windfall (1935)
To Be a Lady (1934)
Get Your Man (1934)
Little Stranger (1934)
Handle with Care (1932)
Self Made Lady (1932)
Deadlock (1931)
Leave It to Me (1930)

Choreographer
Zis Boom Bah (College Sweethearts) (1941)
Dancing Co-Ed (1939)
The Women (1939)
Idiot's Delight (1939)
Rosalie (1937)

Actor
Born to Dance (1936)
The Ramblin' Kid (1923)
Yellow Men and Gold (1922)
Satan Junior (1919)
The City of Dim Faces (1918)

Writer
Midnight (1931)
Little Stranger (1934)
Oh No Doctor! (1934)

External links
 

Film producers from London
1899 births
1966 deaths
Date of birth missing
Film directors from London